Melgaço may refer to:

 Melgaço, Portugal, a municipality in Portugal
 Melgaço, Pará, a municipality in Pará, Brazil
 Barão de Melgaço, a municipality in Mato Grosso, Brazil
 Barão de Melgaço River in western Brazil